Clubul Sportiv Municipal Miercurea Ciuc, commonly known as CSM Miercurea Ciuc or simply Miercurea Ciuc, is a Romanian basketball club based in Miercurea Ciuc, currently participates in the Liga Națională, the top-tier league in Romania.

The club participated in the Liga Naționala between 2012 and 2013, the relegating in the Liga I, where it played until 2017 when the club chose not to join the competition. After a year of absence at senior level CSM Miercurea Ciuc enrolled in 
the top-tier Liga Națională, after the 2018 merge of the top two tiers of Romanian basketball.

Current roster

References

External links
 

2002 establishments in Romania
Basketball teams in Romania
Basketball teams established in 2002
Sport in Miercurea Ciuc